St Michan's, a division of the parliamentary borough of Dublin, was a parliamentary constituency which returned one Member of Parliament (MP) to the House of Commons of the United Kingdom from 1918 until 1922, using the first past the post electoral system.. From 1918 to 1921, it was also used as a constituency for Dáil Éireann.

From the dissolution of 1922, the area was no longer represented in the UK Parliament.

Boundaries
It was defined as:

Glasnevin had been transferred from County Dublin into the city's jurisdiction in 1900; at the last revision of constituencies in 1885, it had been part of the North Dublin division of the County. Arran Quay was transferred from the College Green division of the parliamentary borough.

St Michan's is a civil parish, then within the Arran Quay Ward, which includes both St. Michan's Church of the Church of Ireland and St. Michan's Catholic Church.

History
Under the Redistribution of Seats Act 1885, the parliamentary borough of Dublin had been divided into four divisions: College Green, Dublin Harbour, St Stephen's Green and St Patrick's. Under the Redistribution of Seats (Ireland) Act 1918, the city was allocated three additional seats: Clontarf, St James's and St Michan's. This reflected an increase in population in Dublin relative to the rest of Ireland, and an extension of the city's boundaries in 1900.

At the 1918 general election, Sinn Féin issued an election manifesto in which it called for the "establishment of a constituent assembly comprising persons chosen by Irish constituencies". After the election, Sinn Féin invited all those elected for Irish constistuencies to sit as members of Dáil Éireann, termed Teachta Dála (or TD, known in English as a Deputy). Only those elected for Sinn Féin attended. This included Michael Staines, elected for St Michan's.

Under the Government of Ireland Act 1920, the area was combined with the Clontarf and St James's Divisions to form Dublin North-West, a 4-seat constituency for the Southern Ireland House of Commons and a single-seat constituency at Westminster. At the 1921 election for the Southern Ireland House of Commons, the four seats were won uncontested by Sinn Féin, who treated it as part of the election to the Second Dáil. Michael Staines was one of the four TDs for Dublin North-West.

Under s. 1(4) of the Irish Free State (Agreement) Act 1922, no writ was to be issued "for a constituency in Ireland other than a constituency in Northern Ireland". Therefore, after the dissolution of the House of Commons on 26 October 1922, no vote was held in Dublin North-West at the 1922 United Kingdom general election on 15 November, shortly before the Irish Free State left the United Kingdom on 6 December 1922.

Members of Parliament

Election

See also
 Historic Dáil constituencies

References

External links
 Dáil Éireann Members Database Houses of the Oireachtas
 Dublin Historic Maps: Parliamentary & Dail Constituencies 1780–1969 (a work in progress)

Westminster constituencies in County Dublin (historic)
Dáil constituencies in County Dublin (historic)
Constituencies of the Parliament of the United Kingdom established in 1918
Constituencies of the Parliament of the United Kingdom disestablished in 1922